Rimouski is a city in Quebec, Canada. Rimouski is located in the Bas-Saint-Laurent region, at the mouth of the Rimouski River. It has a population of 48,935 (as of 2021). Rimouski is the site of Université du Québec à Rimouski (UQAR), the Cégep de Rimouski (which includes the Institut maritime du Québec) and the Music Conservatory. It is also the home of some ocean sciences research centres (see below).

History
The city was founded by Sir René Lepage de Ste-Claire in 1696. Originally from Ouanne in the Burgundy region, he exchanged property he owned on the Île d'Orléans with Augustin Rouer de la Cardonnière for the Seigneurie of Rimouski, which extended along the St. Lawrence River from the Hâtée River at Le Bic to the Métis River. De la Cardonnière had been the owner of Rimouski since 1688, but had never lived there. René Lepage moved his family to Rimouski, where it held the seigneurie until 1790, when it was sold to the Quebec City businessman Joseph Drapeau.

The "Maison Lamontagne" was built in 1750 per Marie-Agnès Lepage, granddaughter of René Lepage de Ste-Claire. It carries now the surname of the family that resided at it in 1844. It is one of the oldest half-timbered houses in Quebec and is within what is now called the District of Rimouski-Est.

Today, a boulevard, park and monument at the western entrance of Rimouski bear the name of René Lepage.

The "Red Night"
On May 6, 1950 Rimouski suffered a severe fire, in which 319 houses burned to the ground. This event is known as La nuit rouge (French for Red Night). The fire originated in the Price Brothers Company yard on the left shore of the Rimouski River and quickly crossed the river and spread throughout the city pushed by strong winds, destroying half of the city. No one died in the blaze. Legend has it that a priest sprinkled holy water around the city's cathedral and that the fire would not cross the line.

Demographics 

The 2021 census found that French was the mother tongue of 97.8% of the population. The next most common mother tongues were English (1.2%), Arabic (0.3%), Spanish (0.3%), and Swahili (0.1%).

Economy

Health

The largest employer in Rimouski and the region is the Regional Hospital of Rimouski with 2200 employees and 170 doctors. It handles a budget of more than 150 million dollars. Since 2004 the hospital is known as CSSS Rimouski-Neigette. The hospital serves the large majority of patients in the region as far as Gaspé. Several medical specialties are present at the hospital such as cardiology, endocrinology, fertility, gastroenterology, hematology, obstetric-gynecology, neurology, oncology, otorhinolaryngology, orthopedic, pediatric, rheumatology, surgery, and urology. The hospital also has several departments such as emergency, intensive care, and pharmacy. Several medical clinics surround the hospital located on Rouleau Avenue. The CLSC however is located in front of the obstetrics and gynecology clinic on du Gouverneur Street.

Maritime sector
One of Rimouski's primary economic fields is its maritime sector. Around 1900 the port was important for operating mail tenders such as HMCS Lady Evelyn for transatlantic liners. These could take mail from an arriving ship in the mouth of the St Lawrence, then speed it by rail to Quebec, arriving long before the ship. The town welcomes students at the Institut Maritime du Québec, which offers exclusively marine-related programs of studies. Rimouski is also the home of many marine research centres, such as the Institut des sciences de la mer (ISMER), the Centre de recherche sur les biotechnologies marines and the Centre interdisciplinaire de développement en cartographie des océans.

Rimouski is also home to the headquarters of the St. Lawrence Global Observatory,[2] an inter-institutional group seeking to provide, through its Internet portal, an integrated and rapid access to data and information concerning the global ecosystem of the St. Lawrence, in order to promote sustainable management.

A ferry named the CNM Evolution traverses to Forestville twice daily from May to September.

The port operates five berths ranging from 130 to 213 metres in length, with a water depth of 7.3 metres, and is mainly used for the transshipment of salt.

The tide station located at Pointe-au-Père serves as the reference point for measuring mean sea level for the North American Vertical Datum of 1988, which is the reference point for determining altitude in North America.

Transportation and tourism

 
The city is served by the municipal Rimouski Airport (IATA airport code YXK), which caters to general aviation and cargo aircraft, and by the regional Mont-Joli Airport (YYY), 35 km to the east of Rimouski, which caters to commercial passenger aircraft. There are daily passenger flights to destinations in Quebec (Quebec City, Montreal, and others) and Newfoundland and Labrador.

Between April and October, the CNM Evolution, a ferry service, operates across the Saint Lawrence River between Rimouski and Forestville, Quebec. This ferry is the fastest in the province of Quebec, crossing the river in only 55 minutes.

One end of the Nordik-Express line is in Rimouski; other stops (on the North Shore) of this weekly 1150 km-long line are in Sept-Îles, Port-Menier, Havre-Saint-Pierre, Natashquan, Kegaska, La Romaine, Harrington Harbour, Tête-à-la-Baleine, La Tabatière, Pointe-à-la-truite, Blanc Sablon and St. Barbe. All stops are in the Quebec, except St. Barbe, which is in Newfoundland and Labrador.

The Canadian National south shore railway passes through town, and there is a VIA Rail service three times weekly in each direction, which heads westbound toward Quebec City (Sainte-Foy) and Montreal and eastbound toward Moncton and Halifax.

The Orleans Express bus service also serves Rimouski; Rimouski station is on the main thoroughfare from Quebec City to the maritime provinces.

One of the town's main tourist attractions is the Site historique maritime de la Pointe-au-Père, which features an exhibit on the RMS Empress of Ireland disaster and the Pointe-au-Père lighthouse. The museum's exhibit on the RMS Empress of Ireland disaster commemorates the loss of 1,012 persons in the most fatal shipwreck in the 20th century, after the infamous Titanic tragedy.

Culture
Rimouski has an active cultural life, being the host of the festivals like Festi Jazz International since 1982, the Grandes fêtes du St-Laurent, a familial musical event taking place the first week-end of July and an international films festival, the Carrousel international du film de Rimouski.

In November, the town is the host of the yearly Salon du Livre de Rimouski, the oldest event of the kind in the province of Quebec. It was created in 1964 by a group of women with a passion for literature, who wished to make literature more accessible to young readers. Every year, more than 125 authors from the region and its surroundings participate in the event, and over 300 Quebec Publishers distribute about 75 stands among themselves. Supported by Canada Heritage, the Canada Council of the Arts, the Society of development of the cultural companies of Quebec and the city of Rimouski, the event attracts more than 8000 visitors per year.

Sports
The town is also enthusiastic about sporting events. The town hosted the Jeux du Québec in 2001 and was the host of the Memorial Cup Tournament in 2009.

Since 1995, the town has been home to a QMJHL team, the Rimouski Océanic.  Former Océanic players include Sidney Crosby, Vincent Lecavalier, Michel Ouellet, Brad Richards and Alexis Lafrenière.

Climate
Rimouski has a humid continental climate (Köppen Dfb) with cold, snowy winters and warm, rainy summers.

Municipal council

The city is divided into 11 districts. Six of those districts (Pointe-au-Père, Sainte-Blandine, Rimouski-Est, Sainte-Odile-sur-Rimouski and Le Bic) were small communities but were merged within Rimouski in 2002, except for Le Bic, which was merged in 2009. The municipal council is composed of the mayor and eleven councillors, each one representing a district.

Source: Ville de Rimouski

International relations

Twin towns — Sister cities
Rimouski is twinned with:
 Westmount, Quebec, Canada (since 1968)

Notable residents

 Philomène Belliveau (1854–1940), artist, lived and died in Rimouski.
 Maude Charron, weightlifter, won the gold medal in 64 kg division at the 2020 Summer Olympics in Tokyo.
 Bernard Voyer, explorer,  mountaineer. 
 Patrick Côté, former UFC fighter and MMA competitor.

See also
 Rimouski Seignory
 Rimouski River
 List of cities in Quebec
 Municipal reorganization in Quebec

References

Sources
 St. Lawrence Global Observatory
 Rimouski, Que - The Canadian Encyclopedia

Further reading
 , a novel relating events of the night of May 6, 1950

External links

 City of Rimouski

 
Cities and towns in Quebec
Quebec populated places on the Saint Lawrence River
Populated places established in 1696